Elizabeth Berkeley may refer to:
Elizabeth Beauchamp, Countess of Warwick (1386–1422), née de Berkeley, wife of 13th Earl of Warwick
Elizabeth Berkeley, Countess Berkeley (c. 1720–1792), British court official
Elizabeth Berkeley, Countess of Ormond, wife of Thomas Butler, 10th Earl of Ormond
Lady Elizabeth Germain (1680–1769), nee Lady Elizabeth Berkeley, daughter of Charles Berkeley, 2nd Earl of Berkeley
Elizabeth Somerset, Duchess of Beaufort (died 1799), née Berkeley, mother of Henry Somerset, 5th Duke of Beaufort and wife of Charles, 4th Duke of Beaufort
Elizabeth Craven (1750–1828), nee Berkeley, daughter of the 4th Earl of Berkeley, wife of Lord Craven and then morganatically, of Margrave of Brandenburg-Ansbach
Winifred L. Jackson, who collaborated on two stories with H. P. Lovecraft as Elizabeth (Neville) Berkeley

See also
Elizabeth Berkley (born 1974), American actress